ScreenCorder is a desktop recording tool for Microsoft Windows Operating Systems, developed and distributed by MatchWare. The program allows the user to record everything that happens on their desktop as viewed on their monitor, edit the recording and then export it to a redistributable video format. Uses include the creation of training videos, product support videos, sales presentations, and demonstration videos. Recorded content can be enhanced with audio instructions, graphic speech bubbles, magnifications, animations, and multimedia content.

Educational Uses
ScreenCorder allows educators to create interactive learning videos with a variety of features that can improve the learning experience. Webcam recordings can be inserted directly into a learning video as a picture in picture (PIP) window to engage the viewer with an introduction, explain key lesson points, and provide a more personal aspect to the presentation. Quizzes can be added at any point to access the effectiveness of the learning process. Once the quiz is created, it can be uploaded into a SCORM-compliant Learning Management System (LMS). The scores can be sent by e-mail, printed or stored on the LMS server. ScreenCorder provides the ability to make objects inserted into the leaning video interactive for the viewer; thereby allowing the instructor to further engage the student in the learning activities.

ScreenCorder, along with MatchWare's two other programs, Mediator and OpenMind, is part of a DiDA software suite. The program is used by the pupils to document their projects.

See also
Comparison of screencasting software

References

External links
 ScreenCorder Info Page
 MatchWare Home Page

Windows multimedia software
Proprietary software
Screencasting software